Honcut Creek is a stream in central California in the United States. It is a tributary of the Feather River and flows from the Sierra Nevada south and west into the river] in the Sacramento Valley.

The headwaters are in the Sierra Nevada, and include: North Honcut, Upper Rocky Honcut, South Honcut, and Natchez creeks. The creek area in the lower Feather River watershed includes Honcut, California, and locations of former settlements such as the Maidu's Honkut at the mouth of Honcut Creek and Honcut City, California, along North Honcut Creek.

See also
Feather Headwaters

References

Rivers of Butte County, California
Tributaries of the Feather River
Geography of the Sacramento Valley
Rivers of the Sierra Nevada (United States)
Rivers of Northern California
Rivers of the Sierra Nevada in California